HMS Cockade was a  destroyer of the Royal Navy. A cockade is a knot of ribbons, or other circular- or oval-shaped symbol of distinctive colours which is usually worn on a hat. So far she has been the only ship of the Royal Navy to bear the name.

Cockade was launched on 1 March 1944 and commissioned on 29 September 1945.

Design and construction
The C class were War Emergency Programme destroyers, intended for general duties, including use as anti-submarine escort, and were to be suitable for mass-production. They were based on the hull and machinery of the pre-war J-class destroyers, but with a lighter armament (effectively whatever armament was available) in order to speed production. The 'Co' sub-class of eight ships formed the 13th Emergency Flotilla, one of three flotillas of War Emergency destroyers ordered under the 1942 War Construction Programme (the 'Ch', 'Co' and 'Cr' sub-classes (24 destroyers)) along with 16 of the larger .

Displacement was  standard and  full load.

The ship had a main gun armament of four 4.5-inch (120 mm) QF Mk. IV guns, capable of elevating to an angle of 55 degrees, giving a degree of anti-aircraft capability. The close-in anti-aircraft armament was one Hazemayer stabilised twin mount for the Bofors 40 mm gun, two single  2-pounder (40 mm) "pom-pom"s and two Oerlikon 20 mm cannons. One quadruple mount for 21-inch (533 mm) torpedoes was fitted, while the ship had an depth charge outfit of two depth charge mortars, with a total of 35 charges carried. She had a crew of 186 officers and other ranks.

Cockade was fitted with a Type 293 air/surface warning radar on the ship's lattice foremast, together with a Type 291 air warning radar on a pole mast aft. A Type 275 fire control radar was integrated with the ship's Mk VI HA/LA gun director, while the Hazemayer mount had an integrated Type 282 radar.

Cockade underwent a modernisaton in 1952. One of her 4.5 inch guns was removed and replaced by a double Squid anti-submarine mortar, while the ship's sensor fit was updated, with modified sonar and Type 974 surface warning radar fitted.

Cockade was ordered on 12 September 1942, and was laid down at Yarrow's Scotstoun shipyard on 11 March 1943. She was launched on 7 March 1944 and commissioned on 29 September 1945.

Service

Like all the War Emergency Destroyers ordered under the 1942 construction programme, delays in delivery of the ships fire-control director tower meant that Cockade commissioned too late to see service in the Second World War. She was initially allocated the pennant number R34, although this was later changed to D34. Her first commanding officer was Lt Cdr Terence Desmond Herrick, DSC RN.

After working up, Cockade was deployed to the Far East, joining the 8th Destroyer Flotilla in 1946. While on passage back to the UK from the Far East in December 1947, Cockade and sister ship  were diverted to Aden in response to anti-Jewish rioting, with men from the two destroyers and the survey ship  being landed to try to restore order. On return to the UK, Cockade was used as an air target ship operating out of Plymouth. She returned to the Far East in early 1950, again joining the 8th Destroyer Flotilla.  Like the rest of the 8th Flotilla, Cockade subsequently saw service in the Korean War, taking part in escort, patrol and shore bombardment duties. Whilst there she also visited Singapore and Japan.

Cockades initial deployment to Korea was from July to November 1950, where she formed part of the West Korea Support Element of the US-commanded Task Group 96.5. On 2 August 1950, Cockade and sister ship  bombarded Mokpo, damaging docks and railway sidings. In September and October that year, Cockade provided gunfire support off Wonsan, and on 30 September to 2 October Cockade and the cruise  bombarded the North Korean garrison of Baengnyeongdo island, with Cockade sinking three floating mines during the operation. Cockades next deployment was from March and August 1951. On 7 April she picked up a United States Air Force pilot who had been shot down behind the front lines three months earlier and hidden by Korean civilians. Her next deployment to Korea was from October to December 1951. On the night of 30 November/1 December 1951, Cockade was covering the evacuation of troops from the South Korean-held island of Taehwa-to on the Pansong Archipelago when she was hit by gunfire from the shore, killing one rating.

Cockade began her fourth deployment to Korea on 1 February 1952. On 4 February, Cockade and the cruiser  supported the landings of irregular forces by the landing ships USS LST-516 and USS LST-692 on the island of Mudo-ri. The deployment continued into March, and from 14 April to 2 August Cockade was refitted and modernised at Singapore. Her fifth deployment off Korea was from December 1952 to February 1953 and her fifth from April 1953 to July that year. On 6 May 1953, Cockade bombarded railway targets near Sŏngjin, and was near missed by shore fire, and the next day was again fired on by shore batteries without receiving damage.
 
On 24 August 1953, Cockade came to the assistance of the British mercantile freighter Nigelock (the former Flower-class corvette  ), carrying a cargo of vegetable and fruit deliveries from Shanghai to Amoy via the Taiwan Strait, when Nigelock was intercepted by a Republic of China Navy patrol boat which was enforcing Taiwan's Guanbi policy of blockading the coast of the Chinese mainland. After Cockade fired a warning shot, the Chinese ginboat turned away. Nigelock had been captured by a Republic of China Navy warship the previous week but had been released after intervention by the frigate  .

In 1955, Cockade was deployed in response to the Malayan Emergency, carrying out bombardment duties against Communist insurgents of the Malayan National Liberation Army in south-east Johor, supporting operations by the 1/2 Gurkhas. In November 1956 Cockade was one of several Royal Navy ships to visit Melbourne, Australia for the 1956 Summer Olympics. In December 1956 Cockade visited Bluff and Auckland New Zealand.

In early 1957, Cockade continued to take part in the Malayan Emergency as part of the 8th Destroyer Squadron. On 26 April, during night exercises, a star shell fired by Cockade landed in a gun bay on the Australian destroyer HMAS Tobruk, killing one seaman and severely wounding another. Later in 1957 Cockade was stationed at Hong Kong.

At the end of 1957, on her return journey to Britain, Cockade was diverted to Ceylon (now Sri Lanka) with a cargo of sugar as part of the British response to flooding.

Decommissioning and disposal
Cockade returned to Plymouth from the Far East on 27 January 1958, having steamed over  since her launch, and decommissioned. The destroyer was laid up at Devonport in reserve pending disposal, with duties including acting as an accommodation ship for the frigate . Following her decommissioning Cockade arrived in June 1964 to John Cashmore Ltd for breaking up at Newport, Wales.

References

Publications
 
 
 
 
 
 
 
 
 
 
 

 

Korean War destroyers of the United Kingdom
Cold War destroyers of the United Kingdom
1944 ships
C-class destroyers (1943) of the Royal Navy